The World in Your Home is an NBC Television TV series which aired from December 22, 1944 to 1948, originally broadcast on WNBT, NBC's New York flagship, then broadcast on NBC-affiliate stations WRGB in New York's Capital District and WPTZ in Philadelphia starting shortly after its premiere. The program consisted of educational short films.

Each episode was 15 minutes long, and is believed to be one of the first television programs in the history of the NBC Television network. The series aired after I Love to Eat with James Beard in 1946, and after Campus Hoopla in 1947.  Little else is known about the series.

Episode status
It is unclear if any episodes survive, although it seems unlikely as NBC did not have an archival policy at the time.

See also
1946-47 United States network television schedule
1947-48 United States network television schedule

External links
 

NBC original programming
1944 American television series debuts
1948 American television series endings
American educational television series
Black-and-white American television shows
English-language television shows